Isaiah Alexander Martinez (born September 2, 1994) is an American freestyle wrestler and graduated folkstyle wrestler who competes at 79 kilograms. In freestyle, Martinez is a two–time US Open National champion (three–time finalist) and was the 2017 US U23 World Team Member. As a folkstyle wrestler, he was a two–time NCAA Division I National champion (four–time finalist) and a four–time Big Ten Conference champion.

Folkstyle

High school 
Martinez was born and raised in Lemoore, California. He started wrestling at a young age and became a three-time CIF champion and four-time placer with a 205–7 record as a high schooler at Lemoore High School.

University 
Martinez attended the University of Illinois to wrestle as a collegiate athlete.

2013-2014 
Redshirt; Compiled a 13–2 record during the season (7-0 at open tournaments) and placed fourth at Midlands.

2014-2015 
Freshman; Midlands and Roadrunner Open undefeated champion during regular season. Won the Big Ten Conference and the NCAA championship with notable wins over Dylan Ness, James Green, Nick Brascetta and Brian Realbuto, being the first one to win the championship as an undefeated freshman since Cael Sanderson (99').

2015-2016 
Sophomore; Posted a 17–1 record at duals with lone loss to future three-time NCAA champion Jason Nolf and became the Reno TOC champion during regular season. Won the Big Ten Conference title while avenging his regular season's loss to Jason Nolf. At the NCAA's, he defeated #3 ranked Ian Miller and top-ranked Jason Nolf for the second time to claim the championship.

2016-2017 
Junior; Bumped up a weight class and competed at 165 pounds. He became the UNI Open & Midlands champion and compiled an 11–0 record at duals, ending regular season unbeaten. Became a three-time Big Ten Conference champion and entered as the top-seeded wrestler at the NCAA championships. At the tournament, he made his way to the finale in where he faced Vincenzo Joseph, whom he was 2-0 prior to the match. He lost by fall and claimed runner-up honors.

2017-2018 
Senior; Compiled a record of 11–0 at dual matches in regular season. Became the sixteenth wrestler to ever win four Big Ten Conference championships when he beat Vincenzo Joseph at the finale of the tournament, also entering as the top-ranked seed at the NCAA championships. He defeated four opponents on his way to the finale, in which he faced Vincenzo Joseph for the fifth time in their collegiate career and lost for the second time, claiming once again runner-up honors.

Overall, Martinez is a two-time NCAA champion, four-time NCAA finalist, and four-time Big Ten Conference champion, which makes him the most accomplished Fighting Illini in the history of the wrestling team.

Freestyle

Junior 
As a youth level wrestler, Martinez was a Junior National runner-up and Junior Fargo National champion in both, freestyle and Greco-Roman.

U23 and Senior

2016 
Martinez made his senior freestyle debut at the University National Championships. He defeated all of his opponents by technical fall until the best of three, where he won on points and then by technical fall to win the championship.

2017 
A year later, he competed at the Last Chance Qualifier for the World Team Trials. He defeated three opponents, outscoring them 34-1 and qualifying for the World Team Trials Challenge tournament. There, he passed the quarterfinals with a technical fall win but subsequently lost to four-time NCAA champion Kyle Dake on points and faced three-time NCAA champion Alex Dieringer at the true second match. He also lost the bout by points, placing third at the World Team Trials Challenge.

After failing to make the World Team, Martinez, who was 23 years old at the time, competed at the U23 World Team Trials. He defeated his opponent on points twice and earned his shot at the U23 World Championships.

At the U23 World Championships, he was defeated in the first round by the eventual winner of the championship Gadzhi Nabiev and was thrown to the consolation bracket. There, he defeated two opponents by technical fall and performed at the bronze medal match, where he was defeated by technical fall himself, placing fifth.

2018 
In his first freestyle competition of the year, Martinez attended the US Open. He defeated his first opponent by fall and the other four by technical fall, without getting scored once through the tournament and winning the championship.

After winning the US Open, Martinez automatically advanced to the best-of-three finals of the World Team Trials Challenge. He defeated three-time NCAA Division III champion Nazar Kulchytskyy twice by technical fall and advanced to Final X. At Final X: Lincoln, he faced Olympic gold medalist and four-time World Champion Jordan Burroughs in a best-of-three. He lost the first match by points and the second by technical fall.

He then competed in his first non-world championship international tournament at the senior level, the Medved Prizes. He defeated two opponents to advance to the semifinals but was beaten on points. At the bronze medal match, he defeated his opponent 11 points to 2, claiming the bronze medal.

2019 
To start the year, Martinez competed at the prestigious Golden Grand Prix Ivan Yarygin. He was eliminated in the first round in a close 10–11 loss.

In March, Martinez competed at the World Cup along with the US team. He competed in four matches and defeated all of his opponents (two by technical fall), winning the crown at the 74 kilograms division, even though Team USA placed third as a team.

Next, he competed at the US Open. He won his second straight title at the event by defeating all four of his opponents.

By winning the US Open title, Martinez was automatically set to compete at the finals of the World Team Trials Challenge. The man who won the bracket until the finals was his former collegiate rival Jason Nolf, whom he had to face in a best-of-three. He won the first match by points but subsequently lost by the same method, leading to a third and final match. Despite the earlier bouts being fairly close, he defeated Nolf by technical fall, qualifying for Final X.

A month later, he competed at Final X: Lincoln against Olympic Gold medalist and four-time World Champion Jordan Burroughs in a best-of-three, just like last year (18'). As a big underdog, he lost the first match in a close 4-5 but came back with an upset in the second match, beating Burroughs by criteria with 5 points to 5. At the third and final match, Martinez couldn't hold up and lost the match on points (1-7). This gained him recognition as a top prospect, as he was expected to lose two matches in a row against the 19' World Team Member.

After his failed attempt of making it to the World Championships, he competed at the Continental Cup. He defeated three opponents to make the finals, where he lost by technical fall and earned runner-up honors.

In his last competition of the year, he attended the Bill Farrell Memorial. He opened up with a fall and a technical fall and won his next two bouts on points to make it to the finals. At the finale, he faced collegiate and now international rival Jason Nolf, whom he defeated by technical fall.

2020–2021 
Martinez was scheduled to compete at the US Olympic Team Trials on April 4, 2020, at State College, Pennsylvania. However, the event was postponed for 2021 along with the Summer Olympics due to the COVID-19 pandemic, leaving all the qualifiers unable to compete.

After a year and a half of no competition, Martinez was expected to compete at the rescheduled US Olympic Trials in April 2–3, 2021, as the number one seed (aside from Jordan Burroughs and Kyle Dake, both sitting out), but was forced to pull out due to an injury.

Martinez came back to competition from May 1 to 2 at the US Open National Championships as the number one seed, while also moving up to 79 kilograms. After four victories to reach the finals, Martinez was forced to forfeit, claiming runner–up honors.

Freestyle record 

! colspan="7"| Senior & U23 Freestyle Matches
|-
!  Res.
!  Record
!  Opponent
!  Score
!  Date
!  Event
!  Location
|-
! style=background:white colspan=7 |
|-
|
|
|align=left| Carter Starocci
|style="font-size:88%"|FF
|style="font-size:88%" rowspan=4|September 11–12, 2021
|style="font-size:88%" rowspan=4|2021 US World Team Trials
|style="text-align:left;font-size:88%;" rowspan=4| Lincoln, Nebraska
|-
|Loss
|50–13
|align=left| Alex Dieringer
|style="font-size:88%"|1–6
|-
|Win
|50–12
|align=left| Taylor Lujan
|style="font-size:88%"|10–7
|-
|Win
|49–12
|align=left| Branson Ashworth
|style="font-size:88%"|11–10
|-
! style=background:white colspan=7 |
|-
|Win
|48–12
|align=left| Devin Skatzka
|style="font-size:88%"|Fall
|style="font-size:88%" rowspan=4|May 1, 2021
|style="font-size:88%" rowspan=4|2021 US Open National Championships
|style="text-align:left;font-size:88%;" rowspan=4| Coralville, Iowa
|-
|Win
|47–12
|align=left| Travis Wittlake
|style="font-size:88%"|9–3
|-
|Win
|46–12
|align=left| Hunter Mullin
|style="font-size:88%"|TF 10–0
|-
|Win
|45–12
|align=left| Shane Gantz
|style="font-size:88%"|TF 12–0
|-
! style=background:white colspan=7 |
|-
|Win
|44-12
|align=left| Jason Nolf
|style="font-size:88%"|TF 12-0
|style="font-size:88%" rowspan=5| November 16, 2019
|style="font-size:88%" rowspan=5|2019 Bill Farrell Memorial International Open
|style="text-align:left;font-size:88%;" rowspan=5|
 New York, New York
|-
|Win
|43-12
|align=left| Thomas Gantt
|style="font-size:88%"|8-7
|-
|Win
|42-12
|align=left| Nazar Kulchytskyy
|style="font-size:88%"|12-5
|-
|Win
|41-12
|align=left| Nick Incontrera
|style="font-size:88%"|TF 10-0
|-
|Win
|40-12
|align=left| Gantulga Shijir
|style="font-size:88%"|Fall
|-
! style=background:white colspan=7 |
|-
|Loss
|39-12
|align=left| Atsamaz Sanakoev
|style="font-size:88%"|TF 0-10
|style="font-size:88%" rowspan=4|October 14, 2019
|style="font-size:88%" rowspan=4|2019 Intercontinental Wrestling Cup
|style="text-align:left;font-size:88%;" rowspan=4|
 Khasavyurt, Russia
|-
|Win
|39-11
|align=left| Zhiger Zakirov
|style="font-size:88%"|TF 12-2
|-
|Win
|38-11
|align=left| Adam Khasiev
|style="font-size:88%"|9-9
|-
|Win
|37-11
|align=left| Davlat Khodjiev
|style="font-size:88%"|TF 10-0
|-
! style=background:white colspan=7 |
|-
|Loss
|36-11
|align=left| Jordan Burroughs
|style="font-size:88%"|1-7
|style="font-size:88%" rowspan=3|June 15, 2019
|style="font-size:88%" rowspan=3|2019 Final X: Lincoln
|style="text-align:left;font-size:88%;" rowspan=3|
 Lincoln, Nebraska
|-
|Win
|36-10
|align=left| Jordan Burroughs
|style="font-size:88%"|5-5
|-
|Loss
|35-10
|align=left| Jordan Burroughs
|style="font-size:88%"|4-5
|-
|Win
|35-9
|align=left| Jason Nolf
|style="font-size:88%"|TF 12-2
|style="font-size:88%" rowspan=3|May 19, 2019
|style="font-size:88%" rowspan=3|2019 US World Team Trials Challenge
|style="text-align:left;font-size:88%;" rowspan=3|
 Raleigh, North Carolina
|-
|Loss
|34-9
|align=left| Jason Nolf
|style="font-size:88%"|5-7
|-
|Win
|34-8
|align=left| Jason Nolf
|style="font-size:88%"|9-4
|-
! style=background:white colspan=7 |
|-
|Win
|33-8
|align=left| Thomas Gantt
|style="font-size:88%"|6-4
|style="font-size:88%" rowspan=4|April 27, 2019
|style="font-size:88%" rowspan=4|2019 US Open Wrestling Championships
|style="text-align:left;font-size:88%;" rowspan=4|
 Las Vegas, Nevada
|-
|Win
|32-8
|align=left| Brian Murphy
|style="font-size:88%"|TF 13-0
|-
|Win
|31-8
|align=left| Joey Lavallee
|style="font-size:88%"|TF 13-2
|-
|Win
|30-8
|align=left| Dillon Ulrey
|style="font-size:88%"|TF 10-0
|-
! style=background:white colspan=7 |
|-
|Win
|29-8
|align=left| Yuto Miwa
|style="font-size:88%"|TF 10-0
|style="font-size:88%" rowspan=4|March 17, 2019
|style="font-size:88%" rowspan=4|2019 Wrestling World Cup
|style="text-align:left;font-size:88%;" rowspan=4|
 Yakutsk, Russia
|-
|Win
|28-8
|align=left| Bat-Erdene Byambadorj
|style="font-size:88%"|TF 11-0
|-
|Win
|27-8
|align=left| Reza Afzali
|style="font-size:88%"|6-2
|-
|Win
|26-8
|align=left| Zurabi Erbotsonashvili
|style="font-size:88%"|10-6
|-
! style=background:white colspan=7 |
|-
|Loss
|25-8
|align=left| Azamat Nurykau
|style="font-size:88%"|10-11
|style="font-size:88%"|January 24, 2019
|style="font-size:88%"|2019 Ivan Yarygin Golden Grand Prix
|style="text-align:left;font-size:88%;"|
 Krasnoyarsk, Russia
|-
! style=background:white colspan=7 |
|-
|Win
|25-7
|align=left| Magoma Dibirgadzhiev
|style="font-size:88%"|11-2
|style="font-size:88%" rowspan=4|September 15, 2018
|style="font-size:88%" rowspan=4|2018 Alexander Medved Prizes Ranking Series
|style="text-align:left;font-size:88%;" rowspan=4|
 Minsk, Belarus
|-
|Loss
|24-7
|align=left| Azamat Nurykau
|style="font-size:88%"|5-8
|-
|Win
|24-6
|align=left| Andrius Mazeika
|style="font-size:88%"|11-9
|-
|Win
|23-6
|align=left| Ivan Kusyak
|style="font-size:88%"|8-0
|-
! style=background:white colspan=7 |
|-
|Loss
|22-6
|align=left| Jordan Burroughs
|style="font-size:88%"|TF 1-11
|style="font-size:88%" rowspan=2|June 9, 2018
|style="font-size:88%" rowspan=2|2018 Final X: Lincoln
|style="text-align:left;font-size:88%;" rowspan=2|
 Lincoln, Nebraska
|-
|Loss
|22-5
|align=left| Jordan Burroughs
|style="font-size:88%"|1-4
|-
|Win
|22-4
|align=left| Nazar Kulchytskyy
|style="font-size:88%"|TF 13-2
|style="font-size:88%" rowspan=2|May 20, 2018
|style="font-size:88%" rowspan=2|2018 US World Team Trials Challenge
|style="text-align:left;font-size:88%;" rowspan=2|
 Rochester, Minnesota
|-
|Win
|21-4
|align=left| Nazar Kulchytskyy
|style="font-size:88%"|TF 13-2
|-
! style=background:white colspan=7 |
|-
|Win
|20-4
|align=left| Dan Vallimont
|style="font-size:88%"|TF 10-0
|style="font-size:88%" rowspan=5|April 28, 2018
|style="font-size:88%" rowspan=5|2018 US Open Wrestling Championships
|style="text-align:left;font-size:88%;" rowspan=5|
 Las Vegas, Nevada
|-
|Win
|19-4
|align=left| Jake Sueflohn
|style="font-size:88%"|TF 11-0
|-
|Win
|18-4
|align=left| Jacen Petersen
|style="font-size:88%"|TF 10-0
|-
|Win
|17-4
|align=left| Connor Keating
|style="font-size:88%"|TF 10-0
|-
|Win
|16-4
|align=left| Jacob Thalin
|style="font-size:88%"|Fall
|-
! style=background:white colspan=7 |
|-
|Loss
|15-4
|align=left| Avtandil Kentchadze
|style="font-size:88%"|TF 0-11
|style="font-size:88%" rowspan=4|November 25, 2017
|style="font-size:88%" rowspan=4|2017 World U23 Wrestling Championship
|style="text-align:left;font-size:88%;" rowspan=4|
 Bydgoszcz, Poland
|-
|Win
|15-3
|align=left| Yerkebulan Tileu
|style="font-size:88%"|TF 11-0
|-
|Win
|14-3
|align=left| Andrius Mazeika
|style="font-size:88%"|TF 13-2
|-
|Loss
|13-3
|align=left| Gadzhi Nabiev
|style="font-size:88%"|5-6
|-
! style=background:white colspan=7 |
|-
|Win
|13-2
|align=left| Chance Marsteller
|style="font-size:88%"|7-6
|style="font-size:88%" rowspan=2|October 8, 2017
|style="font-size:88%" rowspan=2|2017 US U23 World Team Trials
|style="text-align:left;font-size:88%;" rowspan=2|
 Rochester, Minnesota
|-
|Win
|12-2
|align=left| Chance Marsteller
|style="font-size:88%"|8-2
|-
! style=background:white colspan=7 |
|-
|Loss
|11-2
|align=left| Alex Dieringer
|style="font-size:88%"|2-4
|style="font-size:88%" rowspan=3|June 9, 2017
|style="font-size:88%" rowspan=3|2017 US World Team Trials Challenge
|style="text-align:left;font-size:88%;" rowspan=3|
 Lincoln, Nebraska
|-
|Loss
|11-1
|align=left| Kyle Dake
|style="font-size:88%"|2-9
|-
|Win
|11-0
|align=left| Kevin LeValley
|style="font-size:88%"|TF 10-0
|-
! style=background:white colspan=7 |
|-
|Win
|10-0
|align=left| Nick Wanzek
|style="font-size:88%"|TF 10-0
|style="font-size:88%" rowspan=3|May 22, 2017
|style="font-size:88%" rowspan=3|2017 US Senior Last Chance World Team Trials Qualifier
|style="text-align:left;font-size:88%;" rowspan=3|
 Rochester, Minnesota
|-
|Win
|9-0
|align=left| Alfred Daniel
|style="font-size:88%"|TF 11-0
|-
|Win
|8-0
|align=left| Michael Schmitz
|style="font-size:88%"|TF 13-1
|-
! style=background:white colspan=7 |
|-
|Win
|7-0
|align=left| Chance Marsteller
|style="font-size:88%"|TF 15-5
|style="font-size:88%" rowspan=7|June 6, 2016
|style="font-size:88%" rowspan=7|2016 US University National Championships
|style="text-align:left;font-size:88%;" rowspan=7|
 Akron, Ohio
|-
|Win
|6-0
|align=left| Chance Marsteller
|style="font-size:88%"|14-10
|-
|Win
|5-0
|align=left| Tyrel White
|style="font-size:88%"|TF 10-0
|-
|Win
|4-0
|align=left| Nate Higgins
|style="font-size:88%"|TF 10-0
|-
|Win
|3-0
|align=left| Raider Lofthouse
|style="font-size:88%"|TF 10-0
|-
|Win
|2-0
|align=left| Marquint Bryant
|style="font-size:88%"|TF 12-2
|-
|Win
|1-0
|align=left| Evan Delong
|style="font-size:88%"|TF 13-2
|-

NCAA record 

! colspan="8"| NCAA Championships Matches
|-
!  Res.
!  Record
!  Opponent
!  Score
!  Date
!  Event
|-
! style=background:white colspan=6 |2018 NCAA Championships  at 165 lbs
|-
|Loss
|17-2
|align=left|Vincenzo Joseph
|style="font-size:88%"|1-6
|style="font-size:88%" rowspan=5|March 17, 2018
|style="font-size:88%" rowspan=5|2018 NCAA Division I Wrestling Championships
|-
|Win
|17-1
|align=left|Alex Marinelli
|style="font-size:88%"|5-1
|-
|Win
|16-1
|align=left|Chance Marsteller
|style="font-size:88%"|MD 10-1
|-
|Win
|15-1
|align=left|Jonathon Chavez
|style="font-size:88%"|10-5
|-
|Win
|14-1
|align=left|Zachary Carson
|style="font-size:88%"|TF 20-5
|-
! style=background:white colspan=6 |2017 NCAA Championships  at 165 lbs
|-
|Loss
|13-1
|align=left|Vincenzo Joseph
|style="font-size:88%"|Fall
|style="font-size:88%" rowspan=4|March 18, 2018
|style="font-size:88%" rowspan=4|2017 NCAA Division I Wrestling Championships
|-
|Win
|13-0
|align=left|Isaac Jordan
|style="font-size:88%"|2-1
|-
|Win
|12-0
|align=left|Nick Wanzek
|style="font-size:88%"|8-5
|-
|Win
|11-0
|align=left|Shaun`Qae McMurtry
|style="font-size:88%"|MD 14-4
|-
! style=background:white colspan=6 |2016 NCAA Championships  at 157 lbs
|-
|Win
|10-0
|align=left|Jason Nolf
|style="font-size:88%"|6-5
|style="font-size:88%" rowspan=5|March 19, 2016
|style="font-size:88%" rowspan=5|2016 NCAA Division I Wrestling Championships
|-
|Win
|9-0
|align=left|Ian Miller
|style="font-size:88%"|SV-1 7-5
|-
|Win
|8-0
|align=left|Nick Brascetta
|style="font-size:88%"|6-3
|-
|Win
|7-0
|align=left|Markus Scheidel
|style="font-size:88%"|MD 15-4
|-
|Win
|6-0
|align=left|Robert Henderson
|style="font-size:88%"|TF 16-0
|-
! style=background:white colspan=6 |2015 NCAA Championships  at 157 lbs
|-
|Win
|5-0
|align=left|Brian Realbuto
|style="font-size:88%"|9-2
|style="font-size:88%" rowspan=5|March 21, 2015
|style="font-size:88%" rowspan=5|2015 NCAA Division I Wrestling Championships
|-
|Win
|4-0
|align=left|James Green
|style="font-size:88%"|3-2
|-
|Win
|3-0
|align=left|Nick Brascetta
|style="font-size:88%"|10-4
|-
|Win
|2-0
|align=left|Spartak Chino
|style="font-size:88%"|Fall
|-
|Win
|1-0
|align=left|Russell Parsons
|style="font-size:88%"|TF 18-2
|-

Stats 

!  Season
!  Year
!  School
!  Rank
!  Weigh Class
!  Record
!  Win
!  Bonus
|-
|2018
|Senior
|rowspan=4|University of Illinois
|#1 (2nd)
|rowspan=2|165
|18-1
|94.74%
|63.16%
|-
|2017
|Junior
|#1 (2nd)
|31-1
|96.88%
|68.75%
|-
|2016
|Sophomore
|#2 (1st)
|rowspan=2|157
|32-1
|96.97%
|66.67%
|-
|2015
|Freshman
|#1 (1st)
|35-0
|100.00%
|68.57%
|-
|colspan=5 bgcolor="LIGHTGREY"|Career
|bgcolor="LIGHTGREY"|116-3
|bgcolor="LIGHTGREY"|97.14%
|bgcolor="LIGHTGREY"|66.79%

Collegiate awards and records 

Senior (17-18)
 NCAA Division I (165 lbs)
 Big Ten Conference (165 lbs)
Big Ten Wrestler of the Championships
Big Ten Medal of Honor recipient
Junior (16-17)
 NCAA Division I (165 lbs)
 Big Ten Conference (165 lbs)
Sophomore (15-16)
 NCAA Division I (157 lbs)
 Big Ten Conference (157 lbs)
University of Illinois Dike Eddleman Male Athlete of the Year
Big Ten Wrestler of the Championships
News Gazette Male Athlete of the Year
Big Ten Wrestler of the Week (12/1/15)
Division I's most technical fall wins in the season (14)
Team's most dual points scored (83)
Freshman (14-15)
 NCAA Division I (157 lbs)
 Big Ten Conference (157 lbs)
Dan Hodge Trophy finalist
Big Ten Freshman of the Year
InterMat Freshman of the Year
Amateur Wrestling News Rookie of the Year
Fighting Illini Male Newcomer of the Year
News Gazette Male Athlete of the Year
Division I's most technical fall wins in the season (11)

Freestyle awards and honors

2019
 World Cup (74 kg)
 Intercontinental Cup (79 kg)
 Final X: Lincoln (74 kg)
 US Open (74 kg)
2018
 Final X: Lincoln (74 kg)
 US Open (74 kg)
2017
 US U23 World Team Trials (74 kg)
 US World Team Trials (74 kg)

References

External links
 

Living people
1994 births
People from Lemoore, California
Illinois Fighting Illini wrestlers
American male sport wrestlers